The Fox Pictograph is a prehistoric rock art site in Stone County, Arkansas. Located near the community of Fox, it is one of two documented examples of rock art depicting humans in the state. It is a stick figure, painted in red pigment, with an unusual depiction of ear ornaments.

The site was listed on the National Register of Historic Places in 1982.

See also
National Register of Historic Places listings in Stone County, Arkansas

References

Archaeological sites on the National Register of Historic Places in Arkansas
Stone County, Arkansas
Rock art in North America
National Register of Historic Places in Stone County, Arkansas